The MCST R1000 is a 64-bit microprocessor developed by Moscow Center of SPARC Technologies (MCST) and fabricated by TSMC.

During development this microprocessor was designated as MCST-4R.

MCST R1000 Highlights
implements the SPARC V9 instruction set architecture (ISA)
quad-core
core specifications:
in-order, dual-issue superscalar
7-stage integer pipeline
9-stage floating-point pipeline
VIS extensions 1 and 2
Multiply–accumulate unit
16 KB L1 instruction cache (parity protection)
32 KB L1 data cache (parity protection)
size 7.6 mm2
shared 2MB L2 cache (ECC protection)
integrated memory controller
integrated ccNUMA controller
1 GHz clock rate
90 nm process
die size 128 mm2
~150 million transistors
power consumption 15W

References

SPARC microprocessors
64-bit microprocessors